"Un banc, un arbre, une rue" ("A Bench, a Tree, a Street") was the winning song of the Eurovision Song Contest 1971 performed in French by French singer Séverine, representing .

The song is a classic French ballad, with the lyric focusing on the loss of childhood innocence, and people following their dreams. The opening lines to the chorus translate as "we all have a bench, a tree, a street/Where we cherished our dreams / a childhood that has been too short".

This song is used as the theme song of Miss Hong Kong Pageant.

Eurovision performance
Four teenage male backup singers provided accompaniment. During Preview Week, Séverine sang the song in the empty square of Monte Carlo, first walking to a bench, then sitting down while performing the middle verses, and then ending the song by walking away out of camera focus.

The song received the then maximum score of 10 points (currently 12 points) from six voting nations.  This song holds the record of receiving the most 10 point scores from this voting era.

"Un banc, un arbre, une rue" was performed third on the night, following 's Joe Grech with "Marija l-Maltija" and preceding 's Peter, Sue & Marc with "Les illusions de nos vingt ans". By the close of voting, it had received 128 points, placing it first in a field of 18.

It was succeeded as the Monegasque representative that year by Peter McLane and Anne-Marie Godart with "Comme on s'aime".

Recordings
Séverine recorded the song in four languages; French, English (as "Chance in Time"), German ("Mach' die Augen zu (und wünsch dir einen Traum)") and Italian ("Il posto"). Despite the existence of an Anglophone version, however, it was the original French version which reached the UK Top 10, a rare non-Anglophone hit in that market.

Paul Mauriat recorded an instrumental version of the song in his 1971 LP of the same title. His version was adapted in 1973 by Television Broadcasts Limited as the theme tune for their Miss Hong Kong Pageant, and has since then been highly familiar among generations of Hong Kong people. In that same year, Finnish singer Carola Standertskjöld recorded her version in Finnish, "Penkki, puu ja puistotie". Siw Malmkvist recorded a Swedish version 1971, "På en gammal bänk" ("On an old bench"). Kirsti Sparboe recorded it in Norwegian as "På en gammel benk" (On an old bench). Heli Lääts and Liilia Vahtramäe recorded an Estonian version "Tänav, pink ja puu" ("A Street, a Bench and a Tree").

Charts

References

External links
 Official Eurovision Song Contest site, history by year, 1971
 Detailed info and lyrics, The Diggiloo Thrush, "Un banc, un arbre, une rue".

Songs about childhood
Eurovision songs of Monaco
Eurovision songs of 1971
Eurovision Song Contest winning songs
1971 songs
Philips Records singles
1971 singles
Songs written by Jean-Pierre Bourtayre
Ultratop 50 Singles (Wallonia) number-one singles